Route 130 is a state highway in Hawaii County, Hawaii, United States. It runs from Route 11 at Ke'aau through the Puna District to Kaimū.



Route description
Route 130 starts from the intersection of Keaau on Route 11, in the south of Hilo. After a junction with It heads south on the east side of Kīlauea to Pahoa, where Route 132 branches out via Kapoho to Cape Kumukahi with further connection to Route 137, and curves toward the west, ending near Kaimū following a junction with Route 137 itself.

History
Route 130 used to travel further to the west along the Chain of Craters Road in Hawaii Volcanoes National Park. However, it was truncated to its current terminus due to the lava flows from Puʻu ʻŌʻō Crater that started in 1983 and buried sections of Kaimū and Kalapana.

Major intersections

See also

References

External links

 0130
Transportation in Hawaii County, Hawaii